Anatoliy Kukoba (b. 8 November 1948, Poltava – d. 17 January 2011) was a Ukrainian politician and the first mayor of Poltava.

See also
 List of mayors of Poltava

External links 
 Anatoliy Kukoba at the Official Ukraine Today portal

1948 births
2011 deaths
Politicians from Poltava
Party of Regions politicians
Governors of Poltava Oblast
Fifth convocation members of the Verkhovna Rada
Fourth convocation members of the Verkhovna Rada
Mayors of places in Ukraine
Recipients of the Order of Prince Yaroslav the Wise, 3rd class
Recipients of the Order of Prince Yaroslav the Wise, 4th class
Laureates of the State Prize of Ukraine in the Field of Architecture
Recipients of the Honorary Diploma of the Cabinet of Ministers of Ukraine